Wet Gold is a 1921 American silent drama film directed by and starring Ralph Ince. It features pirates, a race for buried treasure, and a submarine. The protagonist learns about the treasure from the pirates, who are promptly and conveniently killed in an accident. The second part of the film starts in Havana, Cuba where the protagonist reveals the location of the treasure to others, who split up and race to get it. When they arrive at the undersea location where the treasure is, the separate groups fight, with the protagonist eventually being victorious.

Cast
 Ralph Ince as John Cromwell  
 Aleen Burr as Grace Hamilton  
 Alicia Turner as Susan  
 Harry McNaughton as 'Arry  
 Tom Magrane as Colonel Hamilton 
 John Butler as Chubby Madison 
 Charles McNaughton as James Chipman

References

Bibliography
 Krista A. Thompson. An Eye for the Tropics: Tourism, Photography, and Framing the Caribbean Picturesque. Duke University Press, 2007.

External links

 
 Synopsis from TCM.com
 Synopsis from fan.tv

1921 films
Films directed by Ralph Ince
American silent feature films
1920s English-language films
American black-and-white films
Silent American drama films
1921 drama films
Goldwyn Pictures films
1920s American films